Józefa Kantor (6 March 1896, Tarnów - 25 September 1990) was a Polish teacher, Scoutmaster (harcmistrzyni) founder of the Girl Scouts group "Mury".

Kantor was arrested on 9 November 1940 by the Gestapo and sent to the Ravensbrück concentration camp (inmate number 7261), where she established the secret Girl Scout group "Mury" in November 1941.

1896 births
1990 deaths
Polish schoolteachers
Women in World War II
Polish resistance members of World War II
Polish Scouts and Guides
Women in European warfare
Ravensbrück concentration camp survivors
Polish female soldiers
20th-century Polish women